GD Power Development Company, or Guodian Power Development Company, the subsidiary of China Guodian Corporation, engages in the generation and supply of electric power and heat. It was founded in 1992 and was listed on the Shanghai Stock Exchange in 1997. It is headquartered in Beijing, China. On August 28, 2017, SASAC announced that China Guodian Corporation and Shenhua Group will be  jointly restructured. Shenhua Group will become China Energy Investment Corporation and will absorb China Guodian Corporation.

References

External links

GD Power Development Company 

Companies listed on the Shanghai Stock Exchange
Government-owned companies of China
Electric power companies of China
Energy companies established in 1992
Chinese companies established in 1992